The 2013 FIA GT Series was the first season following on from the demise of the SRO Group's FIA GT1 World Championship, an auto racing series for grand tourer cars. The series underwent changes in 2013, retaining GT3 cars as the mainstay, but creating sub-classes for Pro, Pro-Am and Gentleman driver line-ups. All-Inkl.com Münnich Motorsport did not return to defend their Teams' World Champions, instead moving to the World Touring Car Championship with one of the Drivers' World Champions Marc Basseng beside René Münnich, team director of All-Inkl.com Münnich Motorsport, and defending 2012 WTCC champion Rob Huff.

Calendar
The series commenced at the Circuit Paul Armagnac in France on 1 April and ended at Baku World Challenge in Azerbaijan on 24 November. The six-event calendar contained largely the same events as FIA GT1, with the addition of a race at Circuit Park Zandvoort in the Netherlands. The final time was originally scheduled to be held at a venue in the Middle East before organisers came to an agreement to hold the race on the streets of Baku in Azerbaijan instead.

Entry list

The SRO released the entry list for Nogaro on 22 March.

Race results

Championship standings
Scoring system
Championship points were awarded for the first six positions in each Qualifying Race and for the first ten positions in each Championship Race. The pole-sitter in the qualifying race also received one point, entries were required to complete 75% of the winning car's race distance in order to be classified and earn points. Individual drivers were required to participate for a minimum of 25 minutes in order to earn championship points in any race.

Qualifying race points

Championship race points

Drivers' Championship

Pro Cup

Notes
1 – Stef Dusseldorp was ineligible for Pro Cup points in Baku.

Pro-Am Cup

Gentlemen's Trophy

Teams' Championship

Pro Cup

Pro-Am Cup

Gentlemen's Trophy

Footnotes

See also
2013 Blancpain Endurance Series season

References

External links

 
GT Series